Anthony Charles Tuzzolino (born October 9, 1975) is an Italian-American former professional ice hockey center. Tuzzolino was drafted 113th overall by the Quebec Nordiques in the 1994 NHL Entry Draft. After completing his collegiate career with Michigan State University of the CCHA he went on to play professionally in both the major and minor professional hockey league teams. He played for the Mighty Ducks of Anaheim, the New York Rangers and for the Boston Bruins of the NHL and Cincinnati, Lexington, Hartford, Providence, and Houston in the AHL. His younger brother Nicolas Tuzzolino was also a professional hockey player who played in the AHL and ECHL.

Playing career
Tuzzolino was drafted 113th overall by the Quebec Nordiques in the 1994 NHL Entry Draft. After completing his collegiate career with Michigan State University of the CCHA he went on to play in the National Hockey League. He played for the Mighty Ducks of Anaheim, the New York Rangers and for the Boston Bruins.

In 2003, he moved to Italy to play in their Serie A league, where he had spells with Asiago, Bolzano and Cortina in a three-year spell in the league.  He also had a spell in Sweden's Elitserien with Modo Hockey.  He briefly returned to America with the United Hockey League but soon returned to Italy, joining Renon Ritten. He signed on for another year with the club for 2007–08. After completing his second year with Ritten, Tuzzolino returned to Asiago signing a one-year contract on September 22, 2008.

In the 2009–10 season, Tuzzolino returned to Italy signing with Eppan-Appiano of the Italian Serie B on January 10, 2010.

International play
A dual American-Italian citizen Tuzzolino represented Italy in the 2006 Winter Olympics. After four games with the Italians Tony finished the tournament as the leader with 32 penalty minutes.

Career statistics

Regular season and playoffs

International

References

External links

1975 births
American men's ice hockey centers
American people of Italian descent
Asiago Hockey 1935 players
Binghamton Senators players
Bolzano HC players
Boston Bruins players
Cleveland Lumberjacks players
Cincinnati Mighty Ducks players
Flint Generals players
Hartford Wolf Pack players
HC Eppan Pirates players
Houston Aeros (1994–2013) players
Huntington Blizzard players
Ice hockey people from Buffalo, New York
Ice hockey players at the 2006 Winter Olympics
Kentucky Thoroughblades players
Living people
Louisiana IceGators (ECHL) players
Michigan State Spartans men's ice hockey players
Mighty Ducks of Anaheim players
Modo Hockey players
New York Rangers players
Olympic ice hockey players of Italy
Quebec Nordiques draft picks
SG Cortina players
Ritten Sport players